Bima Arya Sugiarto (born 17 December 1972)  is an Indonesian politician of the National Mandate Party and the official mayor of Bogor since 7 April 2014.

Personal life

Education
After completing high school at SMA Negeri 1 Bogor, he obtained a bachelor's degree in International Relations from Parahyangan Catholic University's Faculty of Politics in 1998. He received a Masters of Arts in Development Studies from Monash University in 2001 and a PhD in Politics from Australian National University in 2006.

Family
Arya is the eldest son of three siblings. His father, Toni Sugiarto, was a police Brigadier General and member of the People's Representative Council until his death in 1997. His mother, Melinda Susilarini, is a former beauty pageant contestant whose father was the caretaker of Cipanas Palace. Arya married Yane Ardian in 2002. They have two children: a son and a daughter.

Career
Following the May 1998 fall of Suharto, Arya became one of the founders of the National Mandate Party (Partai Amanat Nasional or PAN). Between 1998 and 2001, he was a politics lecturer at Parahyangan Catholic University. Afterwards, he moved to Paramadina University, where he still lectures. He  was also as a political observer, although he resigned from active position in 2010 due to conflict of interest with his career in PAN.

As mayor
He ran in Bogor's 2013 mayoral election with Usmar Hariman as deputy, receiving 132,835 votes (33.1%) with the runner-up Ahmad-Aim pair receiving 131,080 (32.7%). His campaign promises included a 100-day program to improve public transport, urban hygiene, bureaucracy and civil administration in addition to the handling of street merchants. Three months into his tenure, he received a second place award from Indonesia Digital Society (behind Surabaya Mayor Tri Rismaharini) due to establishments of online systems for the city. He has also received awards from the Ministry of Health and the National Body of Demographics and Family Planning.

Early in 2015, he established a 24-hour call center for Bogor residents to submit complaints. His leadership has been criticized for perceived lack of performance and perceived intolerance over the prohibition of the Shi'a Ashura celebration, anti-Ahmadiyya sentiments and the continued closure of the GKI Yasmin church.

His name was raised as a possible candidate for deputy governor (paired with Bandung mayor Ridwan Kamil) in the 2018 West Java gubernatorial election, although Arya ruled out running. During a 2014 controversy over a proposed law to scrap direct elections of regional leaders, he was one of the mayors and governors who opposed their party's position, although unlike then-Jakarta governor Basuki Tjahaja Purnama he did not resign from his party.

During the COVID-19 pandemic, Arya tested positive for the disease following his return from a visit to Turkey and Azerbaijan, and was treated as he showed symptoms.

References

1972 births
Living people
Indonesian Muslims
Politicians from West Java
Sundanese people
Mayors and regents of places in West Java
People from Bogor
National Mandate Party politicians
Mayors of places in Indonesia